York Haven is a borough in York County, Pennsylvania, United States. The population was 691 at the 2020 census. The borough is the home of the Brunner Island coal-fired electrical generation plant, located on the Susquehanna River on Wago Road and operated by PPL Corporation.

Geography
York Haven is located at  (40.109502, -76.714819).

Demographics

At the 2000 census there were 809 people, 278 households, and 197 families living in the borough. The racial makeup of the borough was 96.04% White, 0.74% African American, 0.37% Native American, 0.62% Asian, 0.12% from other races, and 2.10% from two or more races. Hispanic or Latino of any race were 1.24%.

Of the 278 households 48.9% had children under the age of 18 living with them, 48.6% were married couples living together, 14.7% had a female householder with no husband present, and 28.8% were non-families. 23.0% of households were one person and 6.8% were one person aged 65 or older. The average household size was 2.91 and the average family size was 3.40.

The age distribution was 36.7% under the age of 18, 8.8% from 18 to 24, 32.8% from 25 to 44, 15.8% from 45 to 64, and 5.9% 65 or older. The median age was 29 years. For every 100 females, there were 99.3 males. For every 100 females age 18 and over, there were 93.9 males. The median household income was $35,000 and the median family income  was $32,917. Males had a median income of $29,375 versus $22,031 for females. The per capita income for the borough was $11,676. About 14.7% of families and 15.0% of the population were below the poverty line, including 17.0% of those under age 18 and none of those age 65 or over.

Education
York Haven is served by the Northeastern York School District.

References

Pennsylvania populated places on the Susquehanna River
Populated places established in 1814
Boroughs in York County, Pennsylvania
1892 establishments in Pennsylvania